Insurance and Finance is a research programme set up by the Geneva Association, also known as the International Association for the Study of Insurance Economics. This research programme on insurance and finance comprises academic and professional research activities in the fields of finance where they are relevant to the insurance and risk management sector.

Mission
The aim of the research programme is dedicated to making an original contribution to the progress of insurance through different initiatives in the field of insurance finance. It engages in: highlighting issues of key importance, promoting studies of the function of finance in insurance, discussing the relevance of financial concepts and instruments to the industry, detecting new and promising theoretical developments, and diffusing knowledge and the results of research worldwide.

Publications
 Insurance and Finance, Geneva Association Information Newsletter, The Geneva Association
 Etudes et Dossiers, Working Paper Series, The Geneva Association
 The Geneva Risk and Insurance Review, formerly The Geneva Papers on Risk and Insurance Theory (until March 2005), The Geneva Association & Springer
 Original Articles, The Geneva Papers on Risk and Insurance - Issues and Practice, Vol.30 - No.2 / April 2005, Palgrave Macmillan
 Insurance and Financial Services Development, The Geneva Papers on Risk and Insurance - Issues and Practice, Vol.26 - No.2 / April 2001, Palgrave Macmillan
 Issues in Law and Economics and Financial Services and Insurance, The Geneva Papers on Risk and Insurance - Issues and Practice, Vol.25 - No.2 / April 2000, Palgrave Macmillan
 Worker's Compensation and Liberalization of Services Trade, The Geneva Papers on Risk and Insurance - Issues and Practice, No.84 / July 1997
 Insurance and Services International Trade, The Geneva Papers on Risk and Insurance - Issues and Practice, No.61 / October 1991
 On the Application of the Continuous-Time Theory of Finance to Financial Intermediation and Insurance, The Geneva Papers on Risk and Insurance - Issues and Practice, No.52 / July 1989

References

External links
A Basic Guide To Life Insurance
How To Pay Medical Bills After A Car Accident?
The Geneva Association Website (known as the International Association for the Study of Insurance Economics)

Research
Insurance
Business and finance professional associations